Edward Jordan (1771–1809) was an Irish rebel, fisherman and pirate in Nova Scotia.  He was typical of the violent but short-lived pirates in the 19th century following the end of "Golden Age of Piracy" in the 18th century.  Born in County Carlow, Ireland, he took part in the Irish rebellions of 1797–1798 but was pardoned and attempted to start a new life as a fisherman in Nova Scotia. However his seasonal fishing operation based at Gaspe Bay was unsuccessful and he racked up large debts. Halifax merchants seized his fishing schooner, The Three Sisters. On 13 September 1809, desperate to avoid losing the schooner, he tried to murder all of the crew sent to seize his schooner. He killed two sailors but the captain, John Stairs, was only wounded and managed to escape overboard. Stairs was rescued by a passing fishing schooner and survived to spread the alarm. A few weeks later the Royal Navy schooner  captured Jordan.

Jordan was convicted of piracy and executed in Halifax, Nova Scotia. His body was covered in tar and hanged from chains in an iron cage called a gibbet at Black Rock Beach in Point Pleasant as a warning to others.  His gibbet joined those of four other across the harbour on McNabs Island who had been executed for mutiny aboard the brig  in the same year. His skull was eventually deposited at the Nova Scotia Museum.  It was recently displayed in the exhibit "Pirates: Myth and Reality" at the Maritime Museum of the Atlantic in Halifax.

Citations

References

 "Pirate Fact Sheet", Maritime Museum of the Atlantic Halifax, 2007 
 MacMechan, Archibald "Jordan the Pirate", Sagas of the Sea, London, 1923, pages 43–55.
 Peirce, Elizabeth, The Pirate Rebel: The Story of Notorious Ned Jordan, Halifax: Nimbus Publishing, 2009.

1771 births
1809 deaths
18th-century Irish people
19th-century Canadian criminals
19th-century pirates
Canadian pirates
Irish pirates
People from Nova Scotia
19th-century executions by the United Kingdom
Irish people executed abroad
People executed for piracy
People executed by Nova Scotia
Recipients of British royal pardons
Irish expatriates in Canada
People from County Carlow
Persons of National Historic Significance (Canada)
People of the Irish Rebellion of 1798
United Irishmen
Canadian mass murderers
Executed mass murderers